A real-time crime center (RTCC) is a centralized technology utilized by law enforcement and emergency first responders. During early adoption, the primary purpose of RTCC was to give field officers and detectives instant information to help identify patterns and stop emerging crime. With emerging cloud-based technology, real-time crime centers in the cloud have evolved to afford enhanced visibility, unified awareness, and the appropriate level of response in emergency resource deployment. Technological advances in RTCC seeks to continually improve emergency response times in the form of instant-live video, live feed camera docking, virtual incident location mapping and full integration with computer-aided dispatch (CAD).

Police departments that have real-time crime centers, include the New York Police Department, Miami-Dade Police Department, Seattle Police Department, Fort Worth Police Department, Metropolitan Police Department, City of St. Louis, Albuquerque Police Department, Austin Police Department, Tampa Police Department, Fresno Police Department, Minneapolis Police Department and Houston Police Department.

Early adoption 

The NYPD RTCC opened on July 18, 2005, and provides support 24/7. The center was built at a cost of $11 million. The information in the center is available to the 37,000 police officers of the New York City Police Department.  The RTCC was funded in part by grants from the non-profit New York City Police Foundation.

RTCC data sources include a data warehouse in which billions of records are made available to detectives and other officers within minutes, instead of days or weeks. These include:
More than 5 million New York State criminal records, parole and probation files,
More than 20 million New York City criminal complaints, arrests, 911/311 calls and summonses spanning five years,
More than 31 million national crime records,
More than 33 billion public records.

The crime center employs satellite imaging and mapping of New York City (using geographic information system software) precinct-by-precinct. The link analysis capacity of the RTCC can track suspects to their known addresses and point detectives to the locations where they are most likely to flee. The Real Time Crime Center was built with the oversight of provider Dimension Data.

Emerging cloud-based technology and innovation 

Real-time crime centers (RTCC) in the cloud are centralized technology platforms which extracts and unifies live video and data feeds from virtually any source, creating a central hub that enhances the situational awareness and investigative capabilities of law enforcement and public safety agencies.

References

External links 
 New York City Police Foundation official site

New York City Police Department